Atakora may refer to:

Atakora Department, Benin
Atakora Province, Benin (historic)
 Atakora River
 Atakora Mountains
 Atakora (Jugu), see Rulers of the Gurmanche state of Jugu